Hibbertia scandens, sometimes known by the common names snake vine, climbing guinea flower and golden guinea vine, is a species of flowering plant in the family Dilleniaceae and is endemic to eastern Australia. It is climber or scrambler with lance-shaped or egg-shaped leaves with the narrower end towards the base, and yellow flowers with more than thirty stamens arranged around between three and seven glabrous carpels.

Description
Flowering occurs in most months and the fruit is an orange aril.

Plants near the coast tend to be densely hairy with spatula-shaped leaves and have flowers with six or seven carpels, whilst those further inland are usually more or less glabrous with tapering leaves and flowers with three or four carpels.

The flowers have been reported as having an unpleasant odour variously described as similar to mothballs or animal urine or sweet but with "a pronounced faecal element".

Taxonomy
Snake vine was first formally described in 1799 by German botanist Carl Willdenow who gave it the name Dillenia scandens in Species Plantarum. In 1805, Swedish botanist Jonas Dryander transferred the species into the genus Hibbertia as H. scandens in the Annals of Botany. The specific epithet (scandens) is derived from Latin, and means "climbing".

Three varieties of H. scandens have been described and the names are accepted by the Australian Plant Census but not by the National Herbarium of New South Wales:
 Hibbertia scandens var. glabra  (Maiden) C.T.White;
 Hibbertia scandens var. oxyphylla  Domin;
 Hibbertia scandens  (Willd.) Dryand. var. scandens.

Distribution and habitat
Hibbertia scandens grows on coastal sand dunes, in open forest and at rainforest margins in an area extending from north-eastern Queensland to the south coast of New South Wales. The species also occurs as an uncommon weed in Auckland, New Zealand.

Use in horticulture
This species is common in cultivation  and adapts to a wide range of growing conditions, including where it is exposed to salt-laden winds. Although it readily grows in semi-shaded areas, it flowers best in full sun and prefers well-drained soil. As it is only hardy down to  it requires winter protection in temperate regions. In the United Kingdom it has gained the Royal Horticultural Society’s Award of Garden Merit.

In popular culture
Hibbertia scandens appeared on an Australian postage stamp in 1999.

See also
List of flora on stamps of Australia

References

External links

scandens
Flora of New South Wales
Flora of Queensland
Plants described in 1806
Taxa named by Carl Ludwig Willdenow